The 88th Assembly District of Wisconsin is one of 99 districts in the Wisconsin State Assembly.  Located in Northeastern Wisconsin, the district covers part of central Brown County, including eastern parts of the city of Green Bay, as well as the villages of Bellevue and Denmark.  The district also contains the University of Wisconsin–Green Bay campus.  The district is represented by John Macco, since January 2015.
  

The 88th Assembly district is located within Wisconsin's 30th Senate district, along with the 89th and 90th Assembly districts.

List of past representatives

References 

Wisconsin State Assembly districts
Brown County, Wisconsin